Egemen HES is hydro electric power station in Turkey. It is on Nilüfer River in Keles ilçe (district) of Bursa Province. The nominal power of the system is 19.92 MWe. In 2015 it produced 95 GW-hr energy. It is operated by the  private Zaf Group.

References

Dams in Bursa Province
Hydroelectric power stations in Turkey
Keles District
Buildings and structures in Bursa Province